Myeloperoxidase (MPO) is a peroxidase enzyme that in humans is encoded by the MPO gene on chromosome 17. MPO is most abundantly expressed in neutrophil granulocytes (a subtype of white blood cells), and produces hypohalous acids to carry out their antimicrobial activity, including hypochlorous acid, the sodium salt of which is the chemical in bleach. It is a lysosomal protein stored in azurophilic granules of the neutrophil and released into the extracellular space during degranulation. Neutrophil myeloperoxidase has a heme pigment, which causes its green color in secretions rich in neutrophils, such as mucus and sputum. The green color contributed to its outdated name verdoperoxidase.

Structure 

The 150-kDa MPO protein is a cationic heterotetramer consisting of two 15-kDa light chains and two variable-weight glycosylated heavy chains bound to a prosthetic heme group complex with calcium ions, arranged as a homodimer of heterodimers. The light chains are glycosylated and contain the modified iron protoporphyrin IX active site. Together, the light and heavy chains form two identical 73-kDa monomers connected by a cystine bridge at Cys153. The protein forms a deep crevice which holds the heme group at the bottom, as well as a hydrophobic pocket at the entrance to the distal heme cavity which carries out its catalytic activity.

Three isoforms have been identified, differing only in the size of the heavy chains.

One of the ligands is the carbonyl group of Asp 96. Calcium-binding is important for structure of the active site because of Asp 96's close proximity to the catalytic His95 side chain.

Function 
MPO is a member of the XPO subfamily of peroxidases and produces hypochlorous acid (HOCl) from hydrogen peroxide (H2O2) and chloride anion (Cl−) (or hypobromous acid if Br- is present) during the neutrophil's respiratory burst. It requires heme as a cofactor. Furthermore, it oxidizes tyrosine to tyrosyl radical using hydrogen peroxide as an oxidizing agent. Hypochlorous acid and tyrosyl radical are cytotoxic, so they are used by the neutrophil to kill bacteria and other pathogens. However, this hypochlorous acid may also cause oxidative damage in host tissue. Moreover, MPO oxidation of apoA-I reduces HDL-mediated inhibition of apoptosis and inflammation. In addition, MPO mediates protein nitrosylation and the formation of 3-chlorotyrosine and dityrosine crosslinks.

Clinical significance 

Myeloperoxidase deficiency is a hereditary deficiency of the enzyme, which predisposes to immune deficiency.

Antibodies against MPO have been implicated in various types of vasculitis, most prominently three clinically and pathologically recognized forms: granulomatosis with polyangiitis (GPA), microscopic polyangiitis (MPA); and eosinophilic granulomatosis with polyangiitis (EGPA). Antibodies are also known as anti-neutrophil cytoplasmic antibodies (ANCAs), though ANCAs have also been detected in staining of the perinuclear region.

Recent studies have reported an association between elevated myeloperoxidase levels and the severity of coronary artery disease.  And Heslop et al. reported that elevated MPO levels more than doubled the risk for cardiovascular mortality over a 13-year period. It has also been suggested that myeloperoxidase plays a significant role in the development of the atherosclerotic lesion and rendering plaques unstable.

Medical uses 

An initial 2003 study suggested that MPO could serve as a sensitive predictor for myocardial infarction in patients presenting with chest pain. Since then, there have been over 100 published studies documenting the utility of MPO testing. The 2010 Heslop et al. study reported that measuring both MPO and CRP (C-reactive protein; a general and cardiac-related marker of inflammation) provided added benefit for risk prediction than just measuring CRP alone.

Immunohistochemical staining for myeloperoxidase used to be administered in the diagnosis of acute myeloid leukemia to demonstrate that the leukemic cells were derived from the myeloid lineage. Myeloperoxidase staining is still important in the diagnosis of myeloid sarcoma, contrasting with the negative staining of lymphomas, which can otherwise have a similar appearance. In the case of screening patients for vasculitis, flow cytometric assays have demonstrated comparable sensitivity to immunofluorescence tests, with the additional benefit of simultaneous detection of multiple autoantibodies relevant to vasculitis. Nonetheless, this method still requires further testing.

Myeloperoxidase is the first and so far only human enzyme known to break down carbon nanotubes, allaying a concern among clinicians that using nanotubes for targeted delivery of medicines would lead to an unhealthy buildup of nanotubes in tissues.

Inhibitors of MPO 

Azide has been used traditionally as an MPO inhibitor, but 4-aminobenzoic acid hydrazide (4-ABH) is a more specific inhibitor of MPO.

See also 
 Chloroma

References

External links

EC 1.11.1
Hemoproteins